Staphylus (Ancient Greek: Στάφυλος "grape cluster") is one of several personages of ancient Greek mythology, almost always associated with grapes or wine:

Staphylus, son of wine-god Dionysus and Ariadne.
 Staphylus, beloved of Dionysus, from the island of Thasos. It is thanks to Dionysus' love for him that Thasian wine is distinguished.
 Staphylus, in a reconstructed myth, the son of Bacchus and Erigone, where Bacchus assumed the form of a grape which Erigone ate. She immediately realized that she was with child and in time gave birth to a son whom she named Staphylus.
 Staphylus, husband of Methe and father of Botrys. The family held court in their palace at Assyria. They received Dionysus as guest and held a banquet in his honor. Staphylus died a sudden death the next morning after the feast; to console his wife and son, Dionysus named grape bunches after Staphylus, drunkenness after Methe, and grapes after Botrys.
 Staphylus, son of Oenomaus, who fought on Dionysus' side against Poseidon in the conflict of the two gods concerning Beroe.
 Staphylus, son of Silenus, who introduced the practice of mixing wine with water.
 Staphylus, goatherd of King Oeneus, who discovered wild grapes as he was pasturing the king's goats and saw one of them chewing on the plant. He presented it to Oeneus, who in his turn invented the way of making the grapes into a drink. When Dionysus visited Oeneus, the king served him the new drink. Dionysus suggested that the drink be named oinos (wine) after Oeneus, and the grapes staphyloi after the goatherd Staphylus.

See also
 Rhoeo
 Staphylococcus

Notes

References 
 Apollodorus, The Library with an English Translation by Sir James George Frazer, F.B.A., F.R.S. in 2 Volumes, Cambridge, MA, Harvard University Press; London, William Heinemann Ltd. 1921. . Online version at the Perseus Digital Library. Greek text available from the same website.
Nonnus of Panopolis, Dionysiaca translated by William Henry Denham Rouse (1863-1950), from the Loeb Classical Library, Cambridge, MA, Harvard University Press, 1940.  Online version at the Topos Text Project.
 Nonnus of Panopolis, Dionysiaca. 3 Vols. W.H.D. Rouse. Cambridge, MA., Harvard University Press; London, William Heinemann, Ltd. 1940–1942. Greek text available at the Perseus Digital Library.
 Pliny the Elder, The Natural History. John Bostock, M.D., F.R.S. H.T. Riley, Esq., B.A. London. Taylor and Francis, Red Lion Court, Fleet Street. 1855. Online version at the Perseus Digital Library.
 Pliny the Elder, Naturalis Historia. Karl Friedrich Theodor Mayhoff. Lipsiae. Teubner. 1906. Latin text available at the Perseus Digital Library.

Children of Dionysus
Demigods in classical mythology
Dionysus in mythology
LGBT themes in Greek mythology